The Sousse Archaeological Museum (Tunisian Arabic: المتحف الأثري بسوسة) is an archaeological museum located in Sousse, Sousse Governorate, Tunisia.

The Museum
The museum is housed in the Kasbah of Sousse's Medina, which was founded in the 11th century AD. It was established in 1951. The museum reopened its doors to the public in 2012, after the collections were rearranged and the edifice was renovated. It contains the second largest collection of mosaics in the world after that of the Bardo National Museum in the capital Tunis.

The Collections

Some votive stelae and urns displayed in the punic room date from as early as the 7th century BC. Artefacts dating from the antiquity up to the 2nd century BC were discovered by French archeologist Pierre Cintas in the Tophet of Sousse and in the Sanctuary of Baal Hammon.

In addition, the museum contains some gorgeous mosaics depicting mythological figures, such as the "Head of Medusa", Face of Oceanus, Neptune on his sea-chariot, or Nilotic scene to name but a few. The museum also exhibits some marble statues from the Roman time period such as the bust of emperor Hadrian and the statue of Roman fertility and manhood god Periapus with his sizeable phallus.

Some funerary artifacts from Hadrumetum (the antique name of Sousse) are also part of the collection, which were discovered in Sousse's two complexes of catacombs dating back from the Roman period, named the Catacomb of Hermes and the Catacomb of Good Shepherd.

The place is named after a marble tablet engraved with a figure of a sheppherd carrying on its shoulder a sheep discovered in the catacombs. This now famous tablet, displayed in the museum, is Christian representation of the Good Shepherd theme, illustrating Jesus self-description in the Gospel of John (I am the good shepherd, who is willing to die for the sheep) as well as illustrating the parabole of the lost sheep comparing God seeking lost humans as a sheppherd leaving his 99 sheep to look for the one lost sheep, "When he has found it, he carries it on his shoulders, rejoicing".  

Among other Christian artefacts in the museum are Christian themed decorative terracotta tablets (for example, a representation of Adam & Eve covering themselves after having eaten the forbidden fruit) and the pride of the museum, a Byzantine period baptismal font, covered with colorful mosaics and found in the nearby town of Bekalta.

The museum also features some local pottery from Greece found within the Punic tombs at El-Kasabah: oil lamps, and some marble funerary epitaphs engraved in Greek and Latin languages.

See also

African archaeology
Culture of Tunisia
List of museums in Tunisia

References

Archaeological museums in Tunisia
Sousse Governorate